This is a list of museums in the United States whose primary focus is on African American culture and history. Such museums are commonly known as African American museums. According to scholar Raymond Doswell, an African American museum is "an institution established for the preservation of African-derived culture."

Museums have a mission of "collecting and preserving material on history and cultural heritage." African American museums share these goals with archives, genealogy groups, historical societies, and research libraries. Museums differ from archives, genealogy groups, historical societies, memorials, and research libraries because they have as a basic educational or aesthetic purpose the collection and display of objects, and regular exhibitions for the public. Being open to the public (not just researchers or by appointment) and having regular hours sets museums apart from historical sites or other facilities that may call themselves museums.

History of African American museums in the United States

The first African American museum was the College Museum in Hampton, Virginia, established in 1868. Prior to 1950, there were about 30 museums devoted to African American culture and history in the United States. These were located primarily at historically black colleges and universities or at libraries that had significant African American culture and history collections.

Important collections were developed at Bennett College in Greensboro, North Carolina; Fisk University in Nashville, Tennessee; Howard University in Washington, D.C.; Lincoln University in Chester County, Pennsylvania; Morgan State University in Baltimore, Maryland; Talladega College in Talladega, Alabama; and Tuskegee University in Tuskegee, Alabama. Additionally, local historical societies, history clubs, and reading groups in African American communities also collected and displayed African American cultural artifacts.

The first independent, nonprofit African American museums in the United States were The African American Museum in Cleveland, Ohio (founded in 1956), the DuSable Museum of African American History in Chicago, Illinois (founded in 1960), and the Charles H. Wright Museum of African American History in Detroit, Michigan (founded in 1965). Throughout the 1960s, the energy of the American Civil Rights Movement led to numerous local African American museums being founded. Between 1868 and 1991, there were about 150 African American museums established in 37 states.

Since its opening in 2016, the largest African American museum in the United States is the Smithsonian Institution's National Museum of African American History and Culture. The previous record holder was the Charles H. Wright Museum of African American History in Detroit, Michigan.

List of museums

This is a sortable table. Click on the column you wish it sorted by.

See also

 African American Museum (disambiguation)
 African-American Heritage Sites

References
Notes

Citations

Bibliography

External links
 Association of African American Museums

 African

African Americans
Museums